These are the official results of the men's 800 metres event at the 1983 IAAF World Championships in Helsinki, Finland. There were a total of 60 participating athletes, with eight qualifying heats, three semi-finals and the final held on 9 August 1983.

From the gun, World Junior Record holder and NCAA Champion Joaquim Cruz went out fast to get the lead, with Peter Elliott in lane 1 accelerating when he saw Cruz ahead of him, passing the break point swinging wide to go around Cruz but Cruz would not let him by.  Coming off the turn, Elliott accelerated and ran past Cruz to take the lead at the bell in 50.58.  Hans-Peter Ferner was next behind them, followed by Willi Wülbeck and Rob Druppers.  Coming off the third turn, Cruz again accelerated to try to take back the lead.  Down the backstretch, Cruz and Elliott ran shoulder to shoulder.  Gritting his teeth, Elliott would not concede the position, Cruz running the final turn outside of Elliott still shoulder to shoulder with now Wülbeck watching the battle from two steps behind.  Off the final turn, Cruz accelerated again to pull away from Elliott but Wülbeck went around the outside to sprint past both of them, unleaded to victory.  Druppers came off the final turn several metres back, passed a fading Ferner and began sprinting, picking off Elliott and then Cruz just before the finish line.

Records
Existing records at the start of the event.

Results

Qualifying heats
The qualifying heats took place on 7 August, with the 60 athletes involved being splitted into 8 heats. The first 2 athletes in each heat ( Q ) and the next 8 fastest ( q ) qualified for the semifinals. 

Heat 1

Heat 2

Heat 3

Heat 4

Heat 5

Heat 6

Heat 7

Heat 8

Semi-finals
The semifinals took place on 8 August, with the 24 athletes involved being splitted into 3 heats. The first 2 athletes in each heat ( Q ) and the next 2 fastest ( q ) qualified for the final. 

Heat 1

Heat 2
 

Heat 3

Final
The final took place on August 9.

References
 Results

 
800 metres at the World Athletics Championships